Moose Jaw—Lake Centre—Lanigan is a federal electoral district in Saskatchewan, Canada, that has been represented in the House of Commons of Canada since 2015. It encompasses a portion of Saskatchewan formerly included in the electoral districts of Blackstrap, Palliser, Regina—Lumsden—Lake Centre, Souris—Moose Mountain, Wascana and Saskatoon—Humboldt.

Moose Jaw—Lake Centre—Lanigan was created by the 2012 federal electoral boundaries redistribution and was legally defined in the 2013 representation order. It came into effect after the 2015 Canadian federal election was called.

Members of Parliament

The riding has been represented by Fraser Tolmie of the Conservative Party since 2021. It has elected the following Members of Parliament:

Election results

References

Saskatchewan federal electoral districts
Moose Jaw
2013 establishments in Saskatchewan